Matching Dreams is a 1916 American short comedy film produced by the American Film Manufacturing Company, released by Mutual Film and directed by  B. Reeves Eason.

Cast
 Sylvia Ashton
 Jimsy Maye
 Vivian Rich
 Gayne Whitman (as Alfred Vosburgh)

References

External links

1916 films
1916 comedy films
1916 short films
Silent American comedy films
American black-and-white films
American silent short films
American Film Company films
American comedy short films
Films directed by B. Reeves Eason
1910s American films